Pascal Jardin (14 May 1934, Paris – 30 July 1980, Villejuif) was a French screenwriter.

Works 
1957: Les Petits Malins, novel,  
1971: La Guerre à neuf ans, Grasset 1971, preface by Emmanuel Berl
1972: Toupie la rage, novel, Bernard Grasset
1973: Guerre après guerre, Grasset & Fasquelle
1975: Je te reparlerai d’amour, novel, Juliard
1978: Le Nain jaune, novel, Julliard, (Grand prix du roman de l'Académie française)
1980: La Bête à bon dieu, Flammarion, postface by François Mitterrand
1980: Madame est sortie, Flammarion, play, preface by Jean Anouilh
 Comme avant, play, Septembre 1976, unpublished

Filmography 
 1960: Classe tous risques  by Claude Sautet
 1961: Les Amours célèbres by Michel Boisrond 
 1962: The Law of Men by Charles Gérard 
 1963: À couteaux tirés by Charles Gérard 
 1964: Les Félins by René Clément
 1964: Monsieur by Jean-Paul Le Chanois
 1964: That Tender Age by Gilles Grangier 
 1965: God's Thunder by Denys de La Patellière
 1965: Marvelous Angelique by Bernard Borderie
 1966: Angelique and the King by Bernard Borderie
 1966: Le Voyage du père by Denys de La Patellière
 1966: Soleil noir by Denys de La Patellière
 1967: Untamable Angelique by Bernard Borderie
 1968: Angelique and the Sultan by Bernard Borderie
 1968: Le Tatoué by Denys de La Patellière
 1969: Les Étrangers by Jean-Pierre Desagnat
 1969: Madly by Roger Kahane 
 1970: La Horse by Pierre Granier-Deferre
 1970: Sortie de secours (film) by Roger Kahane
 1971: Le Chat by Pierre Granier-Deferre
 1971: La Veuve Couderc by Pierre Granier-Deferre
 1971: Doucement les basses by Jacques Deray
 1972: Le Tueur by Denys de La Patellière
 1973: Le Train by Pierre Granier-Deferre
 1974: La Race des seigneurs by Pierre Granier-Deferre 
 1974: Borsalino & Co by Jacques Deray 
 1975: Le Vieux Fusil by Robert Enrico 
 1975: La Cage by Pierre Granier-Deferre
 1978: La Zizanie by Claude Zidi 
 1978: Sale rêveur by Jean-Marie Périer 
 1979: Le Toubib by Pierre Granier-Deferre
 1980: Charlie Bravo by Claude Bernard-Aubert
 1982: Hécate, maîtresse de la nuit by Daniel Schmid

Prizes 
 1st César Awards 1976: nomination at the César du meilleur scénario original ou adaptation for Le Vieux Fusil

Bibliography 
 Thierry Laurent, Pascal Jardin et Alexandre Jardin : la légèreté grave, Paris, Editions de la Société des Écrivains, 2002.
 Fanny Chèze, Pascal Jardin, Éditions Grasset, Paris, 1er octobre 2009, 348 pages

See also 
 Charmeil

External links 
 

Writers from Paris
1934 births
1980 deaths
20th-century French non-fiction writers
French male screenwriters
20th-century French screenwriters
Grand Prix du roman de l'Académie française winners
20th-century French male writers